The 2007 Northeast Conference baseball tournament began on May 24 and ended on May 26, 2007, at New Britain Stadium in New Britain, Connecticut.  The league's top four teams competed in the double elimination tournament.  Third-seeded  won their third tournament championship and earned the Northeast Conference's automatic bid to the 2007 NCAA Division I baseball tournament.

Seeding and format
The top four finishers were seeded one through four based on conference regular-season winning percentage.

Bracket

All-Tournament Team
The following players were named to the All-Tournament Team.

Most Valuable Player
Matt Coulson was named Tournament Most Valuable Player.  Coulson, a pitcher for Monmouth, pitched 7.2 innings allowing one run on five hits in the decisive final game.

References

Tournament
Northeast Conference Baseball Tournament
Northeast Conference baseball tournament
Northeast Conference baseball tournament